Playa Punta Arenas is the most western tip of Margarita Island. It is a fine white sand beach and home for many of the local fishermen. The fishermen's huts extend along a beach which leads to a sandy point which gives its name to both the village and the beach. 

The beach extends along  with calm and clear waters and a few trees. It is possible to see clams and starfish underwater by the shore.

External links 
 Beaches of Margarita Island

Beaches of Venezuela
Margarita Island
Geography of Nueva Esparta
Tourist attractions in Nueva Esparta